Sword Lords is a 1981 board game published by Archive Miniatures & Game Systems.

Gameplay
Sword Lords is a game in which players can run any of the several fantasy battles provided, or design their own battles.

Reception
W. G. Armintrout reviewed Sword Lords in The Space Gamer No. 46. Armintrout commented that "This is incredible - why did Archive do an elegant production job on Sword Lords without editing the rules? The idea is entertaining, the components are wonderful, but I can't recommend the present edition."

References

Board games introduced in 1981